Eamon Corbett (died 21 August 1945) was an Irish Fianna Fáil politician. He was elected to Dáil Éireann as a Fianna Fáil Teachta Dála (TD) for the Galway constituency at a 1935 by-election caused by the death of Martin McDonogh of Fine Gael. He lost his seat at the 1937 general election. He was re-elected for the Galway West constituency at the 1943 general election. He did not contest the 1944 general election.

References

Year of birth missing
1945 deaths
Fianna Fáil TDs
Members of the 8th Dáil
Members of the 11th Dáil
Politicians from County Galway